Wisler may refer to:

People

Daniel Wisler, an American actor, best known for his recurring role in the television series The Unit, as Jeremy Erhart
Matt Wisler, an American baseball player
G. Clifton Wisler, an author of historical fiction books for young adults
Yammi Wisler, electric guitarist for Habiluim, an Israeli, theatrical rock & polka band

Places

Whisler, Ohio, a village in the Kinnikinnick Prairie
Whistler, British Columbia, a Canadian resort town

Other
The Ohio-Indiana Mennonite Conference, also called Wisler Mennonites, an Old Order Mennonite group

See also
 Wissler
 Whistler (disambiguation)